The Climate Investment Funds (CIF) is a multilateral fund established to finance and scale climate pilot projects in developing countries. Established in 2008 at the request of the G8 and G20, the CIF administers a collection of programs that help resource-strapped nations fight the impacts of climate change and accelerate the shift to a low-carbon economy. Through contributions from 14 donor countries, CIF supports more than 350 projects in 72 low and middle-income countries on the frontlines of the climate crisis.

Mafalda Duarte, a Portuguese national, is the current CEO of CIF.

CIF partnerships have channeled more than $60 billion from governments and the private sector to projects such as the world's largest solar park, the first geothermal power plant in South America, and investments in Mexico’s wind power industry. CIF supports 10 of the UN’s 17 Sustainable Development Goals (SDGs).

CIF works in partnership with governments, the private sector, civil society, local communities, and six major multilateral development banks (MDBs). 

Independent evaluations have shown that CIF has succeeded in progress toward a climate-smart future, particularly in the areas of clean technologies, energy access, climate resilience, and sustainable forests.

CIF investments are overseen by a governing board that provides equal authority to donor and recipient countries with input from official observers representing the private sector, civil society, and indigenous peoples.

CIF consists of two funds, the Clean Technology Fund and the Strategic Climate Fund.

Clean Technology Fund
The World Bank is the Trustee of the CIFs, which works with most major multilateral development banks. In June 2019, the CIF governing board decided to indefinitely postpone the CIF "sunset clause."

Solar thermal power provides a useful illustration because it shows promise as a renewable option for baseload power. A recent study indicates that under a carbon pricing scheme with charges consistent with the low-end requirements for safe atmospheric carbon loading, public financing through the CTF Fund could close the cost gap between solar thermal and coal-fired power in a 5 to 10-year program that expands capacity at 500–1000 MW/year. Total Clean Technology Fund subsidies for this program would be $4 – $8 billion – easily within the range for a serious multilateral effort.

Strategic Climate Fund
The Pilot Program for Climate Resilience (PPCR) is the first program under the Strategic Climate Fund. It seeks to explore practical ways to mainstream climate resilience into core development planning and budgeting that is consistent with poverty reduction and sustainable development goals.  The PPCR will build on National Adaptation Programme of Action (NAPAs) and other national strategies and work in 11 pilot countries and regions. It is aligned with, and maintains links to, the Adaptation Fund established under the Kyoto Protocol.

The Scaling-Up Renewable Energy Program (SREP) in Low Income Countries, approved in May 2009, is aimed at demonstrating the economic, social and environmental viability of low carbon development pathways in the energy sector by creating new economic opportunities and increasing energy access through the use of renewable energy.

The Forest Investment Program (FIP), approved in May 2009, aims to support developing countries' efforts to reduce emissions from deforestation and forest degradation by providing bridge financing for readiness reforms and public and private investments.  It will finance efforts to address the underlying causes of deforestation and forest degradation and overcome barriers that have hindered past efforts to do so.

See also
 International Renewable Energy Agency
 Investment in renewable energy

References

External links
 Climate Funds Update - Information on international funding initiatives to tackle climate change
 Proposed Climate Investment Funds (CIF) (World Bank).
 CGDEV Statement Before The Subcommittee.
 World Bank Approves Climate Funds Before G8 Summit.
 Environment Matters.

World Bank
Economics and climate change